Anjanapuram is village in Enkoor mandal. Jannaram is also a major Panchayat in Enkoor mandal.

References

Villages in Khammam district